Nissan Slomiansky (born 10 January 1946) is an Israeli politician. He served as a member of the Knesset for the National Religious Party between 1996 and 1999, and again from 2003-2009, and was re-elected again in 2013. He is a member of the Jewish Home party.

Biography

Slomiansky was born in Ramat Gan during the Mandate era in the family, who migrated from the Second Polish Republic. He was educated at Bnei Akiva's yeshiva in Nechalim, and completed academic studies in physics and mathematics at Bar-Ilan University. He also studied in the Hesder Yeshivat Kerem B'Yavneh, where he was certified as a teacher and ordained as a Rabbi. After his studies, he enlisted to the Nahal Paratroopers unit and reached the rank of first lieutenant. Thereafter, he turned to politics, serving for more than two decades (1977-1998) as the first head of Elkana local council. He was also the secretary-general of Gush Emunim.

In the 1996 elections, Slomiansky was placed 10th on the National Religious Party's list of candidates. He entered the Knesset in May 1997, following the death of Avraham Stern. He lost his seat in the 1999 elections, but regained it in 2003 when he was placed sixth on the party's list of candidates. He was later re-elected to the Seventeenth Knesset in 2006. During this period, he set a record for being the only member of Knesset to be present for 100% of the meetings and votes; likewise, he was known for being an extremely prolific legislator.

Slomiansky headed the parliamentary lobby for elderly persons during the Sixteenth Knesset. Since 2003, he is serving as the party's group chairperson at the Knesset, holding this position during the party's split on the background of the disengagement plan. For the 2009 elections, he won a fourth place on the Jewish Home list, but lost his seat when the party won only three seats. In the 2013 election, he was placed third on the Jewish Home list and was re-elected to Knesset. In 2011, he was appointed Vice President of the Lander Institute, replacing Reserves General Y. Amidror, who was appointed to the Chief of Staff of the National Security Institute.

Following allegations of sexual misconduct, in December 2016, Slomiansky suspended himself from the chairmanship of the Knesset's Constitution, Law, and Justice Committee.

Family
Slomiansky is married, and a father of five children.

References

External links

1946 births
Living people
Bar-Ilan University alumni
Israeli Orthodox Jews
Israeli physicists
Jewish physicists
Israeli people of Polish-Jewish descent
Members of the 14th Knesset (1996–1999)
Members of the 16th Knesset (2003–2006)
Members of the 17th Knesset (2006–2009)
Members of the 19th Knesset (2013–2015)
Members of the 20th Knesset (2015–2019)
National Religious Party politicians
People from Ramat Gan
The Jewish Home politicians